No Man's Nightingale is a novel by crime writer Ruth Rendell published in 2013, It featuring her recurring protagonist Inspector Wexford. The novel is the second in which Wexford has appeared after his retirement, and on this occasion is called in to consult on a crime by his ex colleague and friend Mike Burden.

No Man's Nightingale is, initially, about the (female) vicar (Sarah Hussain) of Saint Peter's Church (in Kingsmarkham) who's been found dead in the vicarage - strangled. Reginald Wexford, now retired as a policeman, assists with the murder investigation,

This was the last novel in the Inspector Wexford series as Rendell died on 2 May 2015, having suffered a stroke earlier that year.

References

2013 British novels
Novels by Ruth Rendell
Inspector Wexford series
Hutchinson (publisher) books